Ischionorox antiqua is a species of beetle in the family Cerambycidae, the only species in the genus Ischionorox.

References

Cerambycini